The Comptroller General of the United States is the director of the Government Accountability Office (GAO, formerly known as the General Accounting Office), a legislative-branch agency established by Congress in 1921 to ensure the fiscal and managerial accountability of the federal government.

Overview

The Budget and Accounting Act of 1921 "created an establishment of the Government to be known as the General Accounting Office, which shall be independent of the executive departments and under the control and direction of the Comptroller General of the United States". The act also provided that the "Comptroller General shall investigate, at the seat of government or elsewhere, all matters relating to the receipt, disbursement, and application of public funds, and shall make to the President when requested by him, and to Congress... recommendations looking to greater economy or efficiency in public expenditures." The Comptroller General is appointed for fifteen years by the President of the United States with the advice and consent of the Senate per .  Also per  when the office of Comptroller General is to become vacant the current Comptroller General must appoint an executive or employee of the GAO to serve as the Acting Comptroller General until such time as a new Comptroller General is appointed by the President and confirmed by the Senate.

The Comptroller General has the responsibility to audit the financial statements that the Secretary of the Treasury and the Director of the Office of Management and Budget present to the Congress and the President. For every fiscal year since 1996, when consolidated financial statements began, the Comptroller General has refused to endorse the accuracy of the consolidated figures for the federal budget, citing "(1) serious financial management problems at the Department of Defense, (2) the federal government’s inability to adequately account for and reconcile intragovernmental activity and balances between federal agencies, and (3) the federal government’s ineffective process for preparing the consolidated financial statements."

The current Comptroller General is Eugene Louis Dodaro, who became Comptroller General on December 22, 2010.  He was preceded by David M. Walker. On February 15, 2008, David Walker, then Comptroller General, announced that he was resigning from GAO to head The Peter G. Peterson Foundation. Eugene Louis Dodaro became Acting Comptroller General of the United States on March 13, 2008, and was subsequently appointed by the President on September 22, 2010, and confirmed by the Senate on December 22, 2010, as the Comptroller General. Dodaro was sworn in as Comptroller General at a ceremony at the GAO on December 30, 2010.

List of U.S. Comptrollers General

See also 
 INTOSAI
 Supreme Audit Institution

References

External links
 
 GAO Press Release about David Walker Departure
 Detailed Table on U.S. Comptrollers General as of January 2011

 
United States
Auditing in the United States